Nez may refer to:

People
 Nez (singer) (born 1979), Turkish singer and dancer Nezihe Kalkan
 Nez, pseudonym of a member of the English alt-rock band Heavy Stereo
 Nez & Rio, an American record production team
 Grace Henderson Nez (1913–2006), Navajo weaver
 Jonathan Nez (born 1975), ninth president of the Navajo Nation

Other uses
 NEZ, acronym for "no escape zone", the effective range of an air-to-air missile
 Nez Cassé, a series of French railroad locomotives
 Nez Perce (disambiguation), multiple uses

See also 
 Pince-nez, a style of eyeglasses